The Roman Catholic Diocese of Grand Falls (erected 29 February 1856, as the Diocese of Harbour Grace) is a Latin suffragan in the Atlantic Canadian ecclesiastical province of the Metropolitan Archdiocese of St. John's, Newfoundland.

The cathedral episcopal see is the Marian Cathedral of the Immaculate Conception, in Grand Falls-Windsor, and it has a former Cathedral, also dedicated to the Immaculate Conception, in Harbour Grace, Newfoundland and Labrador.

History 
  Established on 1856.02.29 as Diocese of Harbour Grace / Portus Gratiæ (Latin) on territory split off from the Archdiocese of St. John's.
 Lost territories repeatedly: on 1870.09.16 to establish Apostolic Prefecture of Placentia and on 1945.07.13 to establish Apostolic Vicariate of Labrador.
 It was renamed as the Diocese of Harbour Grace-Grand Falls on 22 February 1958 and again as the Diocese of Grand Falls on 30 October 1964.

Statistics 
As per 2014, it pastorally served 40,900 Catholics (20.7% of 197,400 total) on 42,368 km2 in 30 parishes and 43 missions with 29 priests (diocesan), 1 deacon and 15 lay religious sisters.

Bishops

Ordinaries 
(all Roman Rite)

Suffragan Bishops of Harbour Grace 
John Dalton; Friars Minor (O.F.M.) (1856.02.29 – death 1869.05.05)
Enrico Carfagnini, O.F.M. (1870.05.13 – 1880.02.27), next Bishop of Gallipoli (Italy) (1880.02.27 – retired 1898.03.24), emeritate as Titular Archbishop of Cius (1898.03.24 – death 1904.02.12)
Ronald MacDonald (1881.05.24 – retired 1906.09.03), emeritate as Titular Archbishop of Gortyna (1906.09.03 – death 1912.09.17)
John March (1906.09.04 – death 1940.01.12)
John Michael O'Neill (1940.01.12 – 1958.02.22 see below)

Suffragan Bishops of Harbour Grace–Grand Falls 
John Michael O'Neill (see above 1958.02.22 – 1964.10.30 see below), died 1974Suffragan Bishops of Grand Falls 
John Michael O'Neill (see above'' 1964.10.30 – 1972.11.23), died 1974
Alphonsus Liguori Penney (1972.11.23 – 1979.04.05), next Metropolitan Archbishop of St. John's, Newfoundland (Canada) (1979.04.05 – retired 1991.02.02)
Joseph Faber MacDonald (1980.01.11 – 1998.10.23), next Bishop of Saint John, New Brunswick (Canada) (1998.10.23 – 2006.09.09); died 2012 
Martin William Currie (2000.12.12 – 1 March 2011), also Apostolic Administrator of Saint John, New Brunswick (Canada) (2006.09.09 – 2007.05.08), Metropolitan Archbishop of St. John's, Newfoundland (Canada) (2007.10.18 – ...)
Robert Anthony Daniels (1 March 2011 - ...), previously Titular Bishop of Scebatiana (2004.09.21 – 2011.03.01) as Auxiliary Bishop of London (Ontario, Canada) (2004.09.21 – 2011.03.01).

Other priest of this diocese who became bishop
 Brian Joseph Dunn, appointed Auxiliary Bishop of Sault Sainte Marie, Ontario in 2008

Bibliography

Sources and external links
 Roman Catholic Diocese of Grand Falls site
 GCatholic with Google map and satellite photo
 Acta Apostolicae Sedis with the decree renaming the diocese

Roman Catholic Ecclesiastical Province of St. John's, Newfoundland
Religious organizations established in 1856
Roman Catholic dioceses and prelatures established in the 19th century
1856 establishments in Newfoundland
1856 establishments in Canada